Cheung King Lok  (born 8 February 1991) is a Hong Kong professional racing cyclist, who most recently rode for UCI Continental team . He rode at the 2015 UCI Track Cycling World Championships. He competed in the 2010 and 2014 Asian Games and won several medals.

Major results

Road
Source: 

2009
 1st  Time trial, Asian Junior Road Championships
2010
 1st Stage 10 Tour de Korea
 4th Time trial, Asian Road Championships
2011
 1st  Time trial, Chinese National Road Championships
 3rd Road race, Hong Kong National Under-23 Road Championships
2012
 1st  Young rider classification Tour de Kumano
 2nd Time trial, Chinese National Road Championships
 4th Overall Tour of Taihu Lake
 10th Overall Tour of Hainan
1st Stage 6
2013
 1st  Time trial, Chinese National Road Championships
 Hong Kong National Road Championships
2nd Time trial
3rd Road race
 2nd Overall Tour de Korea
1st  Young rider classification
 Asian Under-23 Road Championships
4th Road race
6th Time trial
 7th Overall Tour of Thailand
 8th Overall Tour of China I
2014
 Hong Kong National Road Championships
1st  Road race
1st  Time trial
 2nd Overall Tour of Thailand
 6th Time trial, Asian Road Championships
 9th Overall Tour de Korea
2015
 1st  Time trial, Hong Kong National Road Championships
 3rd Overall Tour of Thailand
 3rd Overall Jelajah Malaysia
 7th Overall Tour de Ijen
1st Stage 1
 10th Overall Tour of Fuzhou
2016
 Asian Road Championships
1st  Time trial
1st  Road race
 Hong Kong National Road Championships
1st  Road race
1st  Time trial
2017
 1st  Time trial, Chinese National Road Championships
 Asian Road Championships
3rd  Time trial
3rd  Team time trial
2018
 Asian Road Championships
1st  Time trial
3rd  Team time trial
2019
 1st  Road race, Hong Kong National Road Championships
 3rd  Time trial, Asian Road Championships

Track

2010
 Asian Games
2nd  Individual pursuit
2nd  Team pursuit
 3rd  Team pursuit, Asian Track Championships
2011
 2nd  Team pursuit, Asian Track Championships
2012
 Asian Track Championships
1st  Individual pursuit
2nd  Team pursuit
2013
 3rd  Team pursuit, Asian Track Championships
2014
 Asian Track Championships
1st  Madison
1st  Points race
2nd  Team pursuit
3rd  Omnium
 Hong Kong International Cup
1st Team pursuit
1st Individual pursuit
1st Points race
 3rd  Scratch, UCI Track World Championships
 3rd  Omnium, Asian Games
2015
 Asian Track Championships
1st  Madison
2nd  Individual pursuit
 1st  Points race, 2015–16 UCI Track Cycling World Cup, Cali
2016
 Asian Track Championships
1st  Individual pursuit
2nd  Madison
2nd  Points race
2018
 Asian Track Championships
1st  Madison
2nd  Points race

Footnotes

References

External links
 

1991 births
Living people
Hong Kong male cyclists
Place of birth missing (living people)
Asian Games medalists in cycling
Cyclists at the 2010 Asian Games
Cyclists at the 2014 Asian Games
Cyclists at the 2018 Asian Games
Olympic cyclists of Hong Kong
Cyclists at the 2016 Summer Olympics
Medalists at the 2010 Asian Games
Medalists at the 2014 Asian Games
Medalists at the 2018 Asian Games
Asian Games gold medalists for Hong Kong
Asian Games silver medalists for Hong Kong
Asian Games bronze medalists for Hong Kong
21st-century Hong Kong people